George Gould Lincoln (July 26, 1880 – December 1, 1974) was an American political reporter between the 1900s to 1960s. Lincoln started at The Washington Times and The Washington Post during the 1900s before joining the Washington Evening Star in 1909. With the Evening Star, Lincoln was a political reporter and named the newspaper's chief political writer in 1925. Lincoln remained with the Evening Star until his 1964 retirement and received the Presidential Medal of Freedom in 1970.

Early life and education
On July 26, 1880, Lincoln was born in Washington, D.C. For his post-secondary education, Lincoln graduated with a Bachelor of Arts from Yale University in 1902. His parents were Nathan Smith Lincoln and Jeanie Gould and his sister was Natalie Sumner Lincoln.

Career
Before entering journalism, Lincoln was part of Thomas Edison's 1902 exploration team that looked for nickel in Canada. That year, Lincoln started at the local news department for The Washington Times before becoming editor of the newspaper's Sunday edition. In 1903, Lincoln went to South Carolina and became an assistant superintendent for a tea plantation before resuming his reportorial position in 1904. 

After focusing on the U.S. federal government with the Times, Lincoln joined The Washington Post in 1906 and published stories about the U.S House of Representatives. Upon joining the Washington Evening Star in 1909, Lincoln continued to report on politics for almost six decades. With the Evening Star, Lincoln was named chief political writer in 1925 and remained with the newspaper until he retired in 1964.

Awards and honors

In 1970, Lincoln was awarded the Presidential Medal of Freedom. The citation recognized Lincoln's "great integrity, unfailing skill and uncompromising professionalism".

Personal life
Lincoln died on December 1, 1974 in Washington, D.C. Lincoln was married and had two children from a previous marriage.

References

1880 births
1974 deaths
Journalists from Washington, D.C.
The Washington Star people
The Washington Post people
American newspaper reporters and correspondents
Presidential Medal of Freedom recipients
American political journalists
The Washington Times people